Nancy Ballance is an American politician from San Fernando valley California. She served as a Republican member of the Montana House of Representatives.

References

Living people
People from Hamilton, Montana
Women state legislators in Montana
Republican Party members of the Montana House of Representatives
Year of birth missing (living people)
21st-century American politicians
21st-century American women politicians